James Henry Alexander Majendie (1871 – 12 January 1939) was a British Conservative Party politician.

In August 1897 he was appointed a Deputy Lieutenant of the County of Essex.

He was elected to the House of Commons at the general election in October 1900, having unsuccessfully contested the seat at a by-election in May 1900.

In the 1901 Census of London Majendie is listed as a 29-year-old Member of Parliament living at 3, Queens Arms Gate, Westminster, London with his wife Beatrice and two sons.

He did not contest the 1906 general election.

In 1912 Majendie, described as a Gentleman of no occupation and living at Hedingham Castle, Castle Hedingham in Essex was declared bankrupt In 1914 another Bankruptcy petition was raised against him by two money lenders.
 
Majendie died in the Kerrier Registration district of Cornwall on 12 January 1939 aged 68.

References

External links 
 

1871 births
1939 deaths
Conservative Party (UK) MPs for English constituencies
UK MPs 1900–1906
People from Westminster
Deputy Lieutenants of Essex
Members of the Parliament of the United Kingdom for Portsmouth